Holmes is an unincorporated community in Ridley Township, Delaware County, Pennsylvania, United States.  It is located at  (39.9042791, -75.3085204).

History
The town was named for Richard Holmes a farmer whose family lived in Holmes for almost 100 years. The family's homestead stood where the MacDade Mall stands today.

References

Unincorporated communities in Delaware County, Pennsylvania
Unincorporated communities in Pennsylvania